The 2005 Russian Premier League was the 14th season of the premier football competition in Russia since the dissolution of the Soviet Union and the 4th under the current Russian Premier League name.

Teams 
As in the previous season, 16 teams are playing in the 2005 season. After the 2004 season, Kuban Krasnodar and Rotor Volgograd were relegated to the 2005 Russian First Division. They were replaced by Terek Grozny and Tom Tomsk, the winners and runners up of the 2004 Russian First Division.

Venues

Personnel and kits

Managerial changes

League table

Results

Season statistics

Top goalscorers

Statistics 

 Goals: 539 (average 2.25 per match)
 From penalties: 58 (11%)
 Saved/Missed penalties: 17 (23%)
 Goals scored home: 324 (60%)
 Goals scored away: 215 (40%)
 Yellow cards: 962 (average 4.01 per match)
 For violent conduct: 603 (63%)
 For unsporting behaviour: 287 (30%)
 For undisciplined behaviour: 21 (2%)
 Other: 51 (5%)
 Red cards: 32 (average 0.13 per match) For second yellow card: 20 (63%)
 For denying an obvious goal-scoring opportunity: 3 (9%)
 For unsporting behaviour: 3 (9%)
 For insulting language: 3 (9%)
 For attack wrecking: 1 (3%)
 For violent conduct: 1 (3%)
 Attendance: 2,881,674 (average 12,006 per match; 96,048 per matchday)'''

Awards 
On December 9 Russian Football Union named its list of 33 top players:

Goalkeepers
  Igor Akinfeev (CSKA Moscow)
  Wojciech Kowalewski (Spartak Moscow)
  Sergei Ovchinnikov (Lokomotiv Moscow)

Right backs
  Vasili Berezutski (CSKA Moscow)
  Aleksandr Anyukov (Krylya Sovetov / Zenit)
  Jerry-Christian Tchuissé (FC Moscow)

Right-centre backs
  Sergei Ignashevich (CSKA Moscow)
  Malkhaz Asatiani (Lokomotiv Moscow)
  Antônio Géder (Saturn)

Left-centre backs
  Nemanja Vidić (Spartak Moscow)
  Dmitri Sennikov (Lokomotiv Moscow)
  Erik Hagen (Zenit)

Left backs
  Aleksei Berezutski (CSKA Moscow)
  Calisto (Rubin)
  Pavel Mareš (Zenit)

Defensive midfielders
  Elvir Rahimić (CSKA Moscow)
  Francisco Lima (Lokomotiv Moscow)
  MacBeth Sibaya (Rubin)

Right wingers
  Chidi Odiah (CSKA Moscow)
  Marat Izmailov (Lokomotiv Moscow)
  Vladimir Bystrov (Spartak Moscow)

Central midfielders
  Daniel Carvalho (CSKA Moscow)
  Igor Semshov (Torpedo Moscow)
  Dmitri Loskov (Lokomotiv Moscow)

Left wingers
  Yuri Zhirkov (CSKA Moscow)
  Diniyar Bilyaletdinov (Lokomotiv Moscow)
  Pyotr Bystrov (Saturn)

Right forwards
  Andrei Arshavin (Zenit)
  Dmitri Sychev (Lokomotiv Moscow)
  Aleksandr Kerzhakov (Zenit)

Left forwards
  Dmitri Kirichenko (FC Moscow)
  Vágner Love (CSKA Moscow)
  Derlei (Dynamo Moscow)

Medal squads

See also 
 2005 in Russian football

References

External links 
 RSSSF
 RFPL 

2005
1
Russia
Russia